The Burton process is a thermal cracking process invented by William Merriam Burton and Robert E. Humphreys, each of whom held a PhD in chemistry from Johns Hopkins University. The process they developed is often called the Burton process. More fairly, though, it should be known as the Burton-Humphreys process, since both men played key roles in its development. This issue was settled in court, although the decision gave primary recognition to Burton.

The process uses the destructive distillation of crude oil heated in a still under pressure. In this revolutionary still, different products emerging from a bubble tower at different temperatures and pressures. Of critical importance, the use of these stills more than doubled the production of gasoline from most kinds of oil. The first large-scale use of these towers began with the decision by Standard Oil of Indiana to build 120 stills for an appropriation of $709,000, authorized in 1911. This decision was taken just as the US Supreme Court ordered the dissolution of the Standard Oil Trust.

This thermal cracking process was patented on January 7, 1913 (Patent No. 1,049,667). The first thermal cracking method, the Shukhov cracking process, was invented by Vladimir Shukhov (Patent of Russian Empire No. 12926 on November 27, 1891). While the Russians contended that the Burton process was essentially a slight modification of the Shukhov process, Americans refused to concede and the Burton-Humphreys patent remained in use. Ultimately, it contributed to the development of petrochemicals.

In 1937 the Burton process was superseded by catalytic cracking, but it is still in use today to produce diesel.

See also 
 Cracking (chemistry)
 William Merriam Burton
 Robert E. Humphreys 
 Shukhov cracking process

References

Chemical processes
Petroleum technology